Incilius fastidiosus, or the Pico Blanco toad, is a species of toad from western Panama and southeastern Costa Rica. It inhabits premontane and lower montane rainforest. It is largely a fossorial species that breeds explosively in temporary pools after heavy rains in late April–May. Juveniles occur on rocky stream margins the year round.

It is listed as a critically endangered species due to a drastic population decline, probably caused by chytridiomycosis, and to some extent, habitat loss.

References

fastidiosus
Amphibians of Costa Rica
Amphibians of Panama
Amphibians described in 1875
Critically endangered fauna of North America